Friesland Ridge (Hrebet Frisland \'hre-bet 'fris-land\) is a ridge on Livingston Island in the South Shetlands, part of the Tangra Mountains.

The local ice relief is subject to changes, causing variations in the mountain peaks’ elevation.

First ascent of the summit Mount Friesland by the Catalans Francesc Sàbat and Jorge Enrique from Juan Carlos I Base on 30 December 1991.

The feature takes its name from Mount Friesland.

Location

Maps
 L.L. Ivanov. Livingston Island: Central-Eastern Region. Scale 1:25000 topographic map.  Sofia: Antarctic Place-names Commission of Bulgaria, 1996.
 S. Soccol, D. Gildea and J. Bath. Livingston Island, Antarctica. Scale 1:100000 satellite map. The Omega Foundation, USA, 2004.
 L.L. Ivanov et al. Antarctica: Livingston Island and Greenwich Island, South Shetland Islands. Scale 1:100000 topographic map. Sofia: Antarctic Place-names Commission of Bulgaria, 2005.
 L.L. Ivanov. Antarctica: Livingston Island and Greenwich, Robert, Snow and Smith Islands. Scale 1:120000 topographic map.  Troyan: Manfred Wörner Foundation, 2009.  
 L.L. Ivanov. Antarctica: Livingston Island and Smith Island. Scale 1:100000 topographic map. Manfred Wörner Foundation, 2017.

Notes

References
 Friesland Ridge. SCAR Composite Gazetteer of Antarctica.
 Bulgarian Antarctic Gazetteer. Antarctic Place-names Commission. (details in Bulgarian, basic data in English)

External links
 Friesland Ridge. Copernix satellite image

Tangra Mountains
Ridges of Antarctica